Mohammad Reza Gharaei (born 1980) is an Iranian Strongman and powerlifter.

Strongman career
Reza has competed for Iran in several international strongman competitions.

Reza represented Iran in the 2006 World's Strongest Man contest, but failed reach the finals. Reza also competed in the IFSA World Open in 2005, finishing in 8th place.

Reza participated four times (2004, 2007–2008, 2010) in Iran's Strongest Man competition, winning in 2004, 2007 & 2008.

See also
2006 World's Strongest Man
Iran's Strongest Man

References

1980 births
Living people
Iranian strength athletes
Iranian powerlifters